Qeshlaq-e Bahluleh (also Romanized as Qeshlāq-e Bahlūleh; also known as Bahlūleh) is a village in Chaybasar-e Shomali Rural District, Bazargan District, Maku County, West Azerbaijan Province, Iran. At the 2006 census, its population was 238, in 50 families.

References 

Populated places in Maku County